Emil Magnus Hansson, (born 24 April 1996) is a Swedish handball player for TIF Viking.

He started playing handball in Näsby IF. 2013 he moved on to IFK Kristianstad, mostly playing for their youth team, but a few a games for the senior team. In the season of 2015/16 he was on a apprentice contract with the senior team, but still only got to play a few games. In 2016 he signed for Eskilstuna Guif. 2019 he changed to OV Helsingborg HK. In 2021 he signed a one-year contract for the German Bergischer HC.

Between 2013 and 2017 he played for the Swedish U19 and U21 national teams, with a total of 62 games and 151 goals.

References 

Swedish male handball players
1996 births
Living people
Eskilstuna Guif players
IFK Kristianstad players
Bergischer HC players
People from Kristianstad Municipality
Sportspeople from Skåne County